Action News is a local television newscast format originating in the United States. First conceived in Philadelphia, Pennsylvania, it is characterized by a tight format with strict time limits on set packages, a focus on surrounding suburbs, and a focus on young talent. It was a competitor to the Eyewitness News format.

History
The "Action News" format was conceived in Philadelphia, Pennsylvania, at WFIL-TV (now WPVI-TV) by news director Mel Kampmann in 1970, as a response to the "Eyewitness News" format that was used on rival station KYW-TV. At the time, WFIL-TV was said to be "#4 in a three-station market."

The main difference between Action News and Eyewitness News was that the former was far more tightly formatted. Time limits were placed on packages – for instance, a reporter package could be no longer than 90 seconds. This difference enabled the station to cover more stories than its competitors. Another key difference was the focus on the surrounding Philadelphia suburban areas – a response to the movement of residents from the city to the suburbs. Finally, WPVI placed more emphasis on young talent – while WCAU-TV and KYW-TV used older, well-known news anchors such as Vince Leonard, Tom Snyder, and John Facenda, WPVI had a young Larry Kane as its top anchor. Later, the station would add the very popular Jim O'Brien as its main weathercaster.

The format was immediately successful, and after going back and forth with KYW for first place, WPVI took the lead in 1977, which it has held ever since. Capital Cities Communications, which acquired WPVI in 1972 and gave the station its current call sign, took the format to most of its other stations.

One of the major development stations for WPVI's Action News was its Capital Cities sister station, WKBW-TV in Buffalo, New York. Under the leadership of news director Irv Weinstein, who had developed his own similar format under the name Eyewitness News, WKBW developed much of the talent that WPVI would later hire to boost them to #1 in the market; anchor Jim Gardner (replacing Larry Kane when he moved to WABC in New York), weatherman Dave Roberts, and voice-over artist Jeff Kaye are the three highest-profile WPVI personalities to have come from WKBW.

WPIX in New York City, an independent station at the time, picked up the Action News concept (and music) successfully for its 10 p.m. newscast. The newscast won numerous awards, but the station never approached the ratings of longtime leader WNEW-TV (now WNYW).

In 2002 and 2003 (respectively), WFTS-TV in Tampa, Florida and KSHB-TV in Kansas City, Missouri (both owned by the E. W. Scripps Company) became the first stations in the country to identify themselves using Action News as full-time station branding (for both local newscasts and entertainment programming) with no station number.

Today, Action News innovations have been incorporated into newscasts across the country. In 2000, WestNet Wireless launched the first Action News brand online with its web-broadcast style format for the markets of Calgary, Alberta and Santa Barbara, California WestNet also owns the trademark for Action News in Canada and even owns the domain

Although Action News originated at WPVI, it is Cox Enterprises, whose stations in Atlanta and Jacksonville adopted the format, that owns the Action News trademark for broadcasting services.

Outside the United States, the Action News title was used by the following television stations:
 Germany's RTL II (then known as RTL2) in the 1990s
 CKCO-TV in Kitchener, Ontario, Canada, in the 1980s and 1990s
 NWS-9 in Adelaide, Australia, in the 1980s
 Netherlands' SBS 6 since its inception in 1995 until 2006
 Colombia's Caracol TV (then as a production company for Inravisión) as Noticias de Acción in the 1980s

Theme 
When WFIL originally adopted the Action News format in 1970, the program was introduced with the "Action News Theme".  The theme was written by Temple University student Tom Sellers, who had briefly been in Daryl Hall's band Gulliver and later formed The Assembled Multitude, and was arranged as a brass-driven rock song. The entire theme was offered through The Philadelphia Inquirer, as a single sided 45 RPM record for about 25¢.

Two years later, the station (under its new call sign WPVI) replaced the "Action News Theme" with Al Ham's "Move Closer to Your World". WPVI continues to use this theme after four decades, even as others have stopped using it, although it has been remastered several times (which have included the removal of a bongo line) in order for the theme to sound less dated. In 1996, the station replaced the original Al Ham theme with a fuller, orchestral version performed by the London Philharmonic Orchestra. Viewer outcry caused the station to drop the new version within five days.

Action News offered the first evening newscasts to be solo anchored by a woman: Diana Robinson, who was the first African-American female news anchor in American television. She was followed by Jacqui Mullen.

WPVI opens its broadcasts with a rapid montage featuring scenes of Philadelphia-area activities. The scenes are rotated to reflect the current season. For example, spring footage of the Phillies, NASCAR, CART and DIRT starts on March 21, while footage of the Philadelphia Eagles, Philadelphia Flyers, and 76ers starts on September 23, and footage of the Mummers Parade with other winter scenes is shown from December 21 to March 21.

Although "Move Closer to Your World" is strongly associated with the Action News format, many stations that have used the "Action News" name actually chose to use other pieces of music for their newscasts. Notably, a handful of stations continued to use Tom Sellers' original theme into the 1980s, with WBNG-TV in Binghamton, New York using the theme for its Action News broadcast as late as 1993. Conversely, stations that use "Move Closer to Your World" do not necessarily use the "Action News" name or format. WNEP-TV in Wilkes-Barre/Scranton, Pennsylvania used the original version of the theme for many years before switching to a modern variation which only partially resembles the original.

Stations that use or have used the Action News format or name

See also 
 Eyewitness News

References 

Local news programming in the United States
American television news shows
Franchised television formats